Tamás Gruborovics (born 3 July 1984) is a Hungarian football player who plays for KTP. He formerly played for MP, KuPS, FC KooTeePee and JJK Jyväskylä . During the 2010 season, he was his team's best goalscorer with 10 goals playing for IFK Mariehamn 2009–2010.

On 17 November 2010 he signed a two-year contract with JJK.

His father, Tibor, played six seasons for MP between 1989-1995 and made 177 appearances for the Mikkeli-based club.

In 2011 it was revealed that Gruborovics does not actually hold a Finnish passport despite being raised there and living there since child. He has since declared his interest in playing for the Hungarian national team.

References

External links
  Profile at ifkmariehamn.com

1984 births
Living people
Hungarian footballers
Finnish people of Hungarian descent
Veikkausliiga players
Kuopion Palloseura players
IFK Mariehamn players
FC KooTeePee players
JJK Jyväskylä players
FC Inter Turku players
Sportspeople from Szeged
Kotkan Työväen Palloilijat players
Association football midfielders